Pomona station, also called Pomona–Downtown station, is a train station in Pomona, California, United States. Amtrak's Sunset Limited between Los Angeles and New Orleans and Texas Eagle between Los Angeles and Chicago via Texas, along with Metrolink's Riverside Line trains between Los Angeles and Riverside–Downtown station stop here. It is owned and operated by the City of Pomona.

 The Sunset Limited and Texas Eagle operate as a single combined train, with the eastbound train stopping at the station on Wednesday, Friday and Sunday at 10:40 pm, and westbound trains stopping at the station on Monday, Wednesday and Friday at 4am.

History 

The 1940 station was designed by Donald Parkinson in the Mission Revival and Spanish Colonial Revival styles. Details include stuccoed walls, an arcade and red clay tile roofs. It once served the main Southern Pacific Railroad line from Los Angeles to New Orleans, and the main Los Angeles and Salt Lake Railroad line. Currently both lines are now Union Pacific Railroad lines.

Train service 
Metrolink has served Downtown Pomona station since February 5, 2001. In fourth quarter of Fiscal Year 2015, an average of 221 passengers boarded Riverside Line Metrolink trains at Downtown Pomona station daily. Metrolink trains board at the south platform, across the pedestrian bridge. Approximately 300 parking spaces are available for Metrolink passengers. Originally a center platform was created for additional Metrolink service facing track 2, but was abandoned around 2006 due to declining ridership.

Amtrak trains board at the North platform facing Track 3, near the station building.  There are no Amtrak personnel at the station, but tickets can be picked up from the Metrolink ticket vending machines at the station so long as reservations are made in advance, either on Amtrak's web site, smartphone App, or via telephone.

Amtrak serves the station following a Union Pacific-owned freight route which redirects through El Monte and Baldwin Park to connect to the Monte Vista Rail Corridor, rather than follow the route of the Riverside Line. Of the 77 California stations served by Amtrak, Pomona had the lowest passenger traffic in Fiscal Year 2015, boarding or detraining 1,812, which corresponds to an average of approximately 5 passengers daily due to extremely inconvenient travel times to and from Los Angeles.

The different Pomona (North) station serves the ex Southern Pacific, Pacific Electric and Santa Fe Lines, now the Metrolink San Bernardino line.

Platforms and tracks

Connecting bus service 
Foothill Transit uses the station as a transit center for the area, with extensive connections throughout the San Gabriel Valley. The bus depot is located near the main station building, adjacent to the North platform, across from 1st and Commercial Streets. Foothill operates a transit store and information center in the station building. The Silver Streak provides express service to Downtown Los Angeles seven days a week.

Omnitrans operates route 61 to the Pomona station. Foothill passes are accepted for one trip on Omnitrans, and Omni passes are accepted for one trip on Foothill at the station. The 61 also connects to Ontario Airport.

Both operators provide free rides for passengers holding a valid Metrolink ticket or pass.

References

External links 

Pomona Amtrak-Metrolink Station – USA Rail Guide (TrainWeb)

Amtrak stations in Los Angeles County, California
Metrolink stations in Los Angeles County, California
Former Southern Pacific Railroad stations in California
Los Angeles and Salt Lake Railroad
Railway stations in the United States opened in 1940
John and Donald Parkinson buildings
Mission Revival architecture in California
Spanish Colonial Revival architecture in California
Bus stations in Los Angeles County, California
Proposed California High-Speed Rail stations